Henrik Koch (born 1964) is a Danish scientist. His field is theoretical chemistry. He is Full Professor at Scuola Normale Superiore di Pisa in Italy.

Education and Professional career 
Koch received his Lic.scient. (Ph.D.) in theoretical chemistry from Aarhus University in Denmark in 1991.  In 2002 he was appointed professor at the Natural Science Faculty at the Norwegian University of Science and Technology (NTNU). From 2018 onward he is Full Professor at Scuola Normale Superiore di Pisa, and Adjunct Professor at NTNU.

His research activities focus on «development and application of accurate electronic structure methods for molecules in general, and molecules strongly coupled to optical and plasmonic cavities, in particular.» His research group's projects are showcased on their software platform etprogram.org.

He is involved in the QuantumLight project at NTNU. The project focuses on advanced theoretical models for molecules.

Publications 

 Recent journal articles
 Koch's profile on Publons, with publications and h-index

Awards and honours 

 2007– : Elected member of the Royal Norwegian Society of Sciences and Letters.
 2021: Received an ERC Advanced Grant from the European Research Council.

References

External links 

 

1964 births
Living people
Danish chemists
Academic staff of the Scuola Normale Superiore di Pisa
Academic staff of the Norwegian University of Science and Technology
Royal Norwegian Society of Sciences and Letters
European Research Council grantees
Danish expatriates in Norway
Danish expatriates in Italy